Elettromacumba is the ninth studio album by the  Italian rock band Litfiba and the first with the new line-up following the departure of all previous members except the main composer Ghigo Renzulli, who owns the band's name.

Track listing
 Il pazzo che ride – 5:57
 Elettromacumba intro – 0:22
 Elettromacumba – 4:18
 Il giardino della follia – 4:11
 Piegami – 3:35
 Dall'alba al tramonto – 4:34
 C'est la vie – 5:32
 Spia – 4:27
 Profumo – 4:52
 Il patto – 4:52

Personnel
Gianluigi Cavallo - vocals
Ghigo Renzulli - guitars
Ugo Nativi - drums
Gianluca Venier - bass guitar

References

Litfiba albums
2000 albums
EMI Records albums
Italian-language albums